This is a list of Superboy episodes. The syndicated television series was renamed The Adventures of Superboy in its third season.

Series overview

Episodes

Season 1 (1988–89)

Season 2 (1989–90)

Season 3 (1990–91)

Season 4 (1991–92)

Home releases
All four seasons of this show have been released on DVD by Warner Home Video.

References

External links
 

Superman television series episodes
Lists of DC Comics television series episodes
Lists of fantasy television series episodes